Shekal Gurab-e Pain (also Romanized as Shekāl Gūrāb-e Pā’īn; also known as Shakālgūrāb) is a village in Gasht Rural District, in the Central District of Fuman County, Gilan Province, Iran. At the 2006 census, its population was 827, in 208 families.

References 

Populated places in Fuman County